Bruce Mamando (born 20 January 1974) is a Papua New Guinean rugby league footballer who represented Papua New Guinea in the 1995 and 2000 World Cups.

Background
Bruce Mamando was born in Mount Hagen, Papua New Guinea.

Playing career
He went on to play in fourteen matches for the Raiders over the next three seasons, scoring 3 tries, but struggled to cement a place in the Raiders forward pack which included Bradley Clyde, John Lomax, Quentin Pongia, Jason Croker and David Furner. In 1995 he was selected for the Papua New Guinea Kumuls squad for the 1995 Rugby League World Cup.

He then joined the new Adelaide Rams franchise in 1997 and was in their inaugural side for their match against the North Queensland Cowboys in Townsville on 1 March 1997 for the new Super League season. He spent two years at the ill-fated club, becoming a favorite with the Adelaide fans for his never say die attitude in a team mostly made up of some talented juniors and off-casts from other clubs. As a PNG test player, Mamando was one of the Rams few high-profile players, alongside team captain and former Australian test player and Brisbane Broncos premiership  Kerrod Walters. He played 16 games for the Rams, scoring 5 tries.

In 1999, Mamando was a member of the Sydney Roosters squad for the 1999 season, but failed to make an appearance.

In 2000 Mamando again represented Papua New Guinea at a World Cup. Earlier that season he had joined North Queensland. In 2001 he withdrew from the Papua New Guinea side, citing concerns over selection policies.

References

Living people
Papua New Guinean rugby league players
Papua New Guinea national rugby league team players
1974 births
Canberra Raiders players
Adelaide Rams players
North Queensland Cowboys players
Rugby league props
Rugby league second-rows
Expatriate rugby league players in Australia
Papua New Guinean expatriate rugby league players
Papua New Guinean expatriate sportspeople in Australia
People from the Western Highlands Province